The following is a list of stations owned or operated by Nexstar Media Group. Nexstar owns 197 television stations in markets as large as New York City and as small as San Angelo, Texas, and operates stations owned by Mission Broadcasting, Vaughan Media and White Knight Broadcasting under varied local marketing agreements to satisfy existing regulations set in place by the Federal Communications Commission. In addition, the company owns one radio station, WGN in Chicago. With Nexstar's majority control purchase of The CW in 2022, all CW affiliates directly owned by Nexstar are thus owned-and-operated stations (O&O).

Most of these stations have been added to Nexstar's portfolio via previous acquisitions of Quorum Broadcasting, Newport Television, Communications Corporation of America, West Virginia Media Holdings, Media General and Tribune Media.

Current stations 
Stations are arranged alphabetically by state and by city of license.

Television

Radio

Former stations

Notes

License ownership/operational agreements

Mergers and acquisitions

Satellites, semi-satellites and translators

References

External links